Helmuth is both a masculine German given name and a surname. Notable people with the name include:

Given name;
Helmuth Theodor Bossert (1889–1961), German art historian, philologist and archaeologist
Helmuth Duckadam (born 1959), Romanian former footballer
Helmuth Ehrhardt, German psychiatrist
Helmuth Hübener (1925–1942), German opponent of the Third Reich
Helmuth Koinigg (1948–1974), Austrian racing driver
Helmuth Lehner (born 1968), Austrian musician
Helmuth Lohner (1933–2015), Austrian actor and theatre director
Helmuth Markov (born 1952), German politician
Helmuth von Moltke (disambiguation), several people
Helmuth Nyborg (born 1937), Danish professor at Aarhus University
Helmuth von Pannwitz (1898–1947), German SS Cossack Cavalry Corps officer executed for war crimes
Helmuth Plessner (1892–1985), German philosopher and sociologist
Helmuth Rilling (born 1933), German conductor
Helmuth von Ruckteschell (1890–1948), German navy officer
Helmuth Schneider (1920–1972), German actor
Helmuth Schwenn (1913–1983), German water polo player
Helmuth Søbirk (1916–1992), Danish amateur footballer
Helmuth Stieff (1901–1944), German general and member of the OKH
Helmuth Ternberg (1893–1971), Swedish intelligence officer
Helmuth Weidling (1891–1955), German Army office

Surname:
Frits Helmuth (1931–2004), Danish actor
Justus Christian Henry Helmuth (1745–1824), German-American Lutheran clergyman
Osvald Helmuth (1894–1966), Danish stage and film actor and revue singer; father of Frits Helmuth

See also
HMS Helmuth, a Royal Navy armed tug
Helmuth, a villain in E. E. Smith's Galactic Patrol (novel)

See also
Hellmuth
Helmut

Danish masculine given names
German masculine given names